Marie-Elisabeth Hecker (born 5 March 1987 in Zwickau) is a German cellist. In 2005 she was one of the youngest participants to win first prize at the Concours de violoncelle Rostropovitch, the most important cello competition held every four years in Paris.

Career 
Hecker is the fifth of eight children of a pastor's family from Kirchberg near Zwickau. Already at the age of five her passion for cello developed.

In 1999 she won several competitions of Jugend musiziert; in 2001 the first prize and special prize at the international J. J. F. Dotzauer competition in Dresden. She participated several times in chamber music courses and master classes.

Hecker is one of the 23 young instrumentalists who were invited by the Kronberg Academy (Kronberg, Taunus) to work with the masters of their subjects at the Chamber Music Days for two weeks.

From the 2009/10 to 2011/12 season, Hecker was an artist in the "Junge Wilde" series at the Theater Dortmund.

On June 8, 2010 she played Schumann's Cello Concerto, Op. 129, accompanied by the Staatskapelle Berlin under the baton of Daniel Barenboim, in the context of a much acclaimed gala concert in the Zwickauer Konzertsaal Neue Welt on the occasion of Robert Schumann's 200th birthday.

Hecker is married to the pianist Martin Helmchen, and mother of three daughters.

References

External links 
 David Abrams: Gespräch mit Marie-Elisabeth Hecker vom 6. August 2006
 Homepage von Marie-Elisabeth Hecker
 Generalmanagement von Marie-Elisabeth Hecker
 Gänsehautmomente mit Marie-Elisabeth Hecker (NDR)
 

1987 births
Living people
People from Zwickau
German classical cellists
21st-century German musicians
German women classical cellists
21st-century German women musicians
21st-century cellists